Fyodor Ilyich Selin (7 March 1899 – 8 October 1960) was a Soviet football player and coach.

Honours
 RSFSR champion: 1922, 1927, 1928.
 USSR champion: 1923, 1928, 1931, 1932.

International career
Selin made his debut for USSR on November 16, 1924 in a friendly against Turkey.

External links
  Profile

1899 births
Sportspeople from Tula, Russia
1960 deaths
Russian footballers
Soviet footballers
Association football forwards
Soviet Union international footballers
Soviet football managers
FC Dynamo Moscow players
FC Torpedo Moscow managers